The girls' +63 kg competition at the 2018 Summer Youth Olympics was held on 11 October at the Oceania Pavilion.

Schedule 
All times are in local time (UTC-3).

Bracket

References

External links
Draw Sheet

Taekwondo at the 2018 Summer Youth Olympics
2018 in women's taekwondo